Neil Taylor may refer to:

Neil Taylor (cricketer, born 1959), English cricketer
Neil Taylor (cricketer, born 1964), English cricketer
Neil Taylor (footballer) (born 1989), Welsh footballer
Neil Taylor (journalist) (born 1959), English music journalist
Neil Taylor (guitarist) (born 1961), English guitarist
Neil Taylor (Neighbours), fictional character from the soap opera Neighbours
Piffles Taylor (1893/4–1946), Canadian World War I pilot, Canadian football player, coach, and executive